Mount Oave is a mountain and the highest point of the Marquesas Islands of French Polynesia.

Topography
The summit is a basalt pillar.

Culture
The mountain was featured on French postage stamps in 1979 and 1985.

References

Oave
Marquesas Islands